The Solomon Islands records in swimming are the fastest ever performances of swimmers from Solomon Islands, which are recognised and ratified by the Solomon Islands Swimming Federation.

All records were set in finals unless noted otherwise.

Long Course (50 m)

Men

Women

Short Course (25 m)

Men

Women

References

Solomon Islands
Records
Swimming
Swimming